Bolarum Bazar  is a railway station in Hyderabad, Telangana, India located on the Manmad–Kachiguda section of the South Central Railway.Macha Bollaram, a suburb of Hyderabad, is accessible from this station.

Lines
Hyderabad Multi-Modal Transport System
Secunderabad–Bolarum route – (SB Line)

External links
 MMTS Timings as per South Central Railway

MMTS stations in Ranga Reddy district
Hyderabad railway division